"Higher" is a song written by Jörgen Elofsson and Mathias Venge, recorded by Peter Jöback on his 2000 album Only When I Breathe. It was released as a single the same year.

Charts

References 

2000 singles
Peter Jöback songs
2000 songs
Songs written by Jörgen Elofsson